Mr Bean Group Limited is a is a Singapore-based retailer that specializes in soybean-based food and drink products. The company was founded in 1995 as a hawker stall that sold soy milk and soy beancurd, and has since expanded its product line and retail presence.

The company currently operates through its managing company, Super Bean International Pte Ltd, which oversees the production and distribution of Mr Bean's products. The company's products include a variety of soybean-based food and drink items such as soy milk, beancurd, pancakes, and ice cream.

As of August 2018, Mr Bean had a chain of 67 retail outlets, with four of these located overseas - two in the Philippines, one in South Korea, and one in Japan. The majority of Mr Bean's retail outlets are located in Singapore.

Mr Bean utilizes a closed-loop system to produce its soy milk and beancurd, which minimizes waste and reduces its environmental impact.

History
Mr Bean was founded in 1995 by Kang Puay Seng, who is now the managing director of Super Bean International, and Loh Jwee Poh, executive director of Super Bean and Kang's schoolmate. The first Mr Bean stall was located at People's Park Hawker Centre.

Having found a machine that could make soya milk quickly and efficiently, they established small kiosks in accessible areas at shopping malls, hospitals, schools and MRT stations. Subsequently, additional stalls were opened. Today, Mr Bean operates more than 76 outlets worldwide and has overseas presence in Vietnam, Japan and South Korea.

Outlets

Singapore
In 2013, Mr Bean had more than 30 local outlets in Singapore. As of January 2020, Mr Bean has a total of 76 outlets, with some outlets located near Singapore MRT stations.

Japan
In January 2010, in a partnership with Tokyu Gourmet Front, Super Bean International opened a Mr Bean outlet in Shibuya, Japan, at the Shibuya Train Station.

Future
In March 2012, the Mr Bean group announced that it will open twelve stores across the region by the end of the year, to add to its five outlets in Tokyo, Seoul, Malaysia and Shanghai.

With the regional expansion underway, Mr Bean hopes to double the number of overseas stores to 34 by 2013 and eventually expand to other markets such as the United States. However, due to franchising issues in China, and poor sales and business failures in Malaysia, Mr Bean closed all its franchise stores in Malaysia and China.

Branding
The company’s name, Mr Bean, originated when both founders wanted to differentiate their stall from their competitors. As the founders were selling soya bean drinks and both of them were men, they decided to call their company Mr Bean. When Mr Bean was launched in 1995, their original logo had an ‘oriental’ look.

Products
As of 2008, Mr Bean offered at least 28 products. Its soya drinks range from plain soya milk to variations of soya milk that include chendol soya milk, fruity soya milk and icy mocha soya milk. Mr Bean also produces a wide range of products that use soya beans, such as various flavours of soya milk, biscuits, pancakes and ice cream. The company also diversified to sell Mr Bean merchandise that appealed to the
younger consumers.

Some of their merchandise includes towels, plush toys, bookmarks and bags. Mr Bean sought to continually improve the quality of their products and invent new products. To do that, they invested in R&D to brainstorm and develop new product ideas, and also organised sample testing sessions.

References

External links
 Official website

Retail companies of Singapore
Retail companies established in 1995
Fast-food chains of Singapore
Singaporean brands
Specialty food shops in Singapore